Vijaykumar Gavit is a leader of Bharatiya Janata Party and a member of Maharashtra Legislative Assembly from Nandurbar.

Vijaykumar Gavit was welcomed to the party fold by Leader of Opposition in the Maharashtra Legislative Assembly Eknath Khadse on 6 September 2014.

Political career
Vijaykumar Gavit took oath in the new government which has 18 ministers from the Congress and 20 from NCP, including Deputy Chief Minister Chhagan Bhujbal on 7 November 2009.

Positions held

Within BJP

Legislative

 *Member, Maharashtra Legislative Assembly -  Since 1995

 Minister of state (Maharashtra) of Health and Family Welfare : 1995–1999.
 Minister of state (Maharashtra) of Tribal Affairs: 1999–2004.
 Cabinet Minister of Maharashtra (Minister of Tribal Affairs): 2004–2009.
 Cabinet Minister of Maharashtra (Minister of Medical Education and Food Production): 2009–2014.
 Cabinet Minister of Maharashtra (Minister of Tribal Affairs): 2022

References

Maharashtra MLAs 2004–2009
Maharashtra MLAs 2014–2019
People from Nandurbar district
Marathi politicians
Nationalist Congress Party politicians from Maharashtra
State cabinet ministers of Maharashtra
Maharashtra MLAs 1999–2004
Maharashtra MLAs 1995–1999
Maharashtra MLAs 2019–2024
Bharatiya Janata Party politicians from Maharashtra
1970 births
Living people